Krisztián Nagy may refer to:

 Krisztián Nagy (footballer, born 1992), Hungarian football player
 Krisztián Nagy (footballer, born 1995), Hungarian footballer
 Krisztián Nagy (ice hockey) (born 1994), Hungarian ice hockey player